The discography of the South Korean boy group Super Junior the fifth sub-unit Super Junior-D&E consists of three studio albums, five extended plays, and twenty one singles.

Albums

Studio albums

Notes

Extended plays

Singles

Music videos

Notes

References

External links

Discography
Discographies of South Korean artists
K-pop music group discographies